Port Gibson Female College was a female seminary, founded in Port Gibson, Mississippi, in 1843. It closed in 1908.

History 
The college was founded in 1843.  In 1869 it was donated to the Methodist Episcopal Church, South.  Unlike many small colleges in Mississippi, the Port Gibson Female College did not shut down during the civil war.  It closed in 1908.

One of the college's original buildings now serves as the city hall of Port Gibson.

See also 
 Women's colleges in the United States
 Timeline of women's colleges in the United States

References 

Defunct private universities and colleges in Mississippi
Former women's universities and colleges in the United States
Educational institutions established in 1843
Female seminaries in the United States
Education in Claiborne County, Mississippi
Educational institutions disestablished in 1908
History of women in Mississippi
1908 disestablishments in Mississippi
Methodist Episcopal Church, South
1843 establishments in Mississippi
Port Gibson, Mississippi